The 2005 Amstel Gold Race, these are the results for the 40th edition of the annual Amstel Gold Race cycling classic, which was held on Sunday April 17, 2005 and gave  its first major classic win.

General Standings

17-04-2005: Maastricht-Valkenburg, 250.7 km.

External links
Race website

Amstel Gold Race
Amstel Gold Race
2005 in Dutch sport